Gregory James Hannon  (born 1964) is a professor of molecular cancer biology and director of the Cancer Research UK Cambridge Institute at the University of Cambridge. He is a Fellow of Trinity College, Cambridge while also serving as a director of cancer genomics at the New York Genome Center and an adjunct professor at Cold Spring Harbor Laboratory.

Career and research 
Hannon is known for his contributions to small RNA biology, cancer biology, and mammalian genomics.  He has a history in discovery of oncogenes, beginning with work that led to the identification of CDK inhibitors and their links to cancer.  More recently, his work has focused on small RNA biology, which led to an understanding of the biochemical mechanisms and biological functions of RNA interference (RNAi).  He has developed widely used tools and strategies for manipulation of gene expression in mammalian cells and animals and has generated genome-wide short hairpin RNA (shRNA) libraries that are available to the cancer community and was among the first to demonstrate roles for microRNAs in cancer.  His laboratory also discovered the piwi-interacting RNA (piRNA) pathway and linked this to transposon repression and the protection of germ cell genomes.  His innovations include the development of selective re-sequencing strategies, broadly termed exome capture.

In 2017, Hannon was awarded a £20 million Cancer Grand Challenges award to unite the IMAXT team - a team of researchers from Switzerland, Ireland, Canada, the USA and the UK, with far ranging expertise from cancer biology and pathology to astronomy and even VR video game design. The team's aim is to create an interactive 3D map of cancer, which could be explored in virtual reality. The programme could transform the way researchers study cancer by providing unprecedented insight into how individual cells are arranged and how they interact to allow the tumour to grow.

In 2018, it was announced Prof Hannon would guide the Functional Genomics Centre, a collaboration between Cancer Research UK and AstraZeneca. The centre, housed inside the Milner Therapeutics Institute, aims to act as a hub for genetic screens, cancer models, CRISPR tool design, and computational approaches to big data to understand genetic changes in cancer development and identify potential drug targets.

Awards and honours 

 Pew Scholar in the Biomedical Sciences, 1997
 Rita Allen Scholar, 2000
 US Army Breast Cancer Research Programme Innovator Award, 2002
 AACR Award for Outstanding Achievement in Cancer Research, 2005
 National Academy of Sciences Award in Molecular Biology, 2007
 Memorial Sloan-Kettering Cancer Center Paul Marks Prize for Cancer Research, 2007
 National Academy of Sciences Member, 2012
 Royal Society Wolfson Professorship, 2015
 Academy of Medical Sciences member, 2017
 EMBO member, 2018
 The Royal Society Fellow, 2018
European Academy of Cancer Sciences Fellow, 2019
Fellow of the American Association for Cancer Research Academy, 2020

References

Living people
Royal Society Wolfson Research Merit Award holders
Members of the European Molecular Biology Organization
Fellows of Trinity College, Cambridge
Fellows of the Royal Society
Fellows of the Academy of Medical Sciences (United Kingdom)
Case Western Reserve University alumni
Molecular biologists
Howard Hughes Medical Investigators
1964 births